Pospíchal (feminine Pospíchalová) is a Czech surname. Notable people with the surname include:

 Bohuslav Pospíchal, Czech slalom canoer
 Eduard Pospichal (1838–1905), Austrian botanist
 Tomáš Pospíchal (1936–2003), Czech footballer

Czech-language surnames